Frederick George Lee (6 January 1832 in Thame, Oxfordshire – 22 January 1902 at Lambeth, London) was a priest of the Church of England and a religious author. He co-founded the Order of Corporate Reunion.

Biography
Lee was trained in Cuddesdon Theological College and ordained to priesthood in 1856 by the Bishop of Oxford, Samuel Wilberforce. Lee became, together with Ambrose de Lisle and others, a co-founder of the Association for the Promotion of the Unity of Christendom (APUC) in 1857. In Aberdeen, he had difficulties with the bishop concerning his ritualistic practices; he later became vicar of All Saints' Lambeth, London.

In 1874, Lee, John Thomas Seccombe, and Thomas Wimberley Mossman founded a clandestine Anglo-Papalist society, the Order of Corporate Reunion, to continue the work of the APUC and to restore an apostolic succession recognised by the Roman Catholic Church through reordinations, as a means for reunion. Lee is believed to have been secretly consecrated as a bishop by some Roman Catholic prelates whose names were kept secret until 2000. Lee styled himself Bishop of Dorchester for a while and performed some ordinations, but later became disillusioned and believed that he made a mistake.

In the late 1880s, Lee was a member of the Order of the White Rose, the club that sparked the Neo-Jacobite Revival in the United Kingdom. On 11 December 1901, Lee was received into the Roman Catholic Church, shortly before his death.

In addition to his published sermons, books, and literary work, Lee edited numerous periodicals during his career, including The Union Newspaper (1856-1862), The Scottish Miscellany (1860-1861), The Union Review (1863-1869), The Church News (1867-1869), The Church Herald (1870), The Lambeth Review (1872), The Reunion Magazine (1877-1879, four numbers issued irregularly).

Works

Poems, 1850, 1854 (2nd ed.)
The Martyrs of Vienne and Lyons: A Prize Poem Recited in the Theatre, Oxford, June 28, 1854
Our Village and Its Story, with a Postscript: Verses, 1855
The Progress of the Church: A Sermon, 1857
Until the Day Break: A Sermon Preached in Substance at the Mission Church of S. Saviour, Wellclose Square, S. George's-in-the-East, Diocese of London, 1857
Death, Judgment, Hell, and Heaven: Four Advent Sermons, 1858
Refrain from These Men: A Sermon, 1859
The Cheyne Case: A Letter to Adam Urquhart, 1860
The Gospel Message: A Series of Original Sermons (editor, 1860)
A Statement of Facts, with Regard to His Resignation of the Incumbency of St. John's, Aberdeen, 1861
Clinton Maynard: A Tale of the World, the Flesh, and the Devil, 1862
 [i. e. Episcopal Church of Scotland
Prayers for the Reunion of Christendom (edit.), 1863
The Message of Reconciliation: Four Advent Sermons, 1864
Sermons on the Reunion of Christendom (edit.), 1864
Directorium Anglicanum, 1865 (2nd ed.), 1878 (4th ed.) Also online from Archive.org
Paraphrastica expositio articulorum Confessionis Anglicanae, 1865 (editor)

Notitia Liturgica, 1866
Morning and Evening Prayers Specially Intended for Children, together with Devotions for the Holy Sacrifice, 1866
The King's Highway, 1866, 1872 (2nd ed.)
Altar Service Book, 3 vol., 1867
Essays on the Reunion of Christendom (edit.), 1867
Mary, the Mother of God, 1868
Sermons, Parochial and Occasional, 1868
Petronilla, and Other Poems, 1869
The "Sour Grapes" of Dis-union: A Sermon Preached in Substance at All Saints' Church, Lambeth, 1869

The Beauty of Holiness: Ten Lectures on External Religious Observances, 1860, 1869 (4th ed.)
Confidence in God: A Sermon, 1871
Our Duty to the Departed: A Sermon, 1871
A Dictionary of Ritual and Other Ecclesiastical Terms, 1871
The Abolition and Rejection of the Athanasian Creed: A Letter, 1872
The Christian Doctrine of Prayer for the Departed, 1872
Rest in Death: A Funeral Sermon on the Decease of the Rev. John Purchas, 1872
Manuale Clericorum, 1874
The Bells of Botteville Tower and Other Poems, 1874
The Other World, Or Glimpses of the Supernatural, 1875
volume one
volume two
Memorials of R. S. Hawker (edit.), 1876
A Glossary of Liturgical and Ecclesiastical Terms, 1877
Pastoral Letter by the Rector, Provincials, and Provosts of the Order of Corporate Reunion, 1877
The Repeal of the Public Worship Regulation Act: A Letter, 1877
More Glimpses of the World Unseen, 1878
Historical Sketches of the Reformation, 1879
The Words from the Cross: Seven Sermons, 1879
The Church under Queen Elizabeth, 1880
volume one
volume two
"new and cheaper edition" 1897
Hymns for Several Occasions, together with a Litany for the Faithful Departed, 1880
Order out of Chaos: Three Sermons Preached at All Saints', Lambeth, 1881
Reginald Barentyne, or Liberty without Limit: A Tale of the Times, 1881, 1883 (2nd ed.)

From Crown to Crown: A Tale of the Early Church, 1885
Glimpses in the Twilight, 1885
King Edward the Sixth, Supreme Head, 1886
On Fads and Fadmongers, 1887
Immodesty in Art: An Expostulation and Suggestion, 1887
Reginald Pole: Cardinal Archbishop of Canterbury: An Historical Sketch with an Introductory Prologue and Practical Epilogue, 1888
A Manual of Politics, 1889
The Sinless Conception of the Mother of God, 1891
Sights and Shadows, 1894
De Profundis: Various Verses, 1899
The Ecclesiastical Situation in 1899, from a Tractarian Standpoint, 1899

References

Dictionnaire d'Histoire et de Géographie Ecclésiastiques, Fasciscule 180, p. 74

External links

Lee, Frederick George, article in (Schaff-Herzog Encyclopedia of Religious Knowledge)
Pitts Theology Library: Lee, Frederick George, 1832-1902. Collection, 1853-1899
Bibliographic directory from Project Canterbury

1832 births
1902 deaths
19th-century English Anglican priests
English Anglo-Catholics
Alumni of Ripon College Cuddesdon
Bishops of Independent Catholic denominations
Anglican priest converts to Roman Catholicism
People from Thame
Anglo-Catholic clergy
Neo-Jacobite Revival
Anglo-Catholic writers
19th-century Anglican theologians
20th-century Anglican theologians
Anglo-Catholic theologians